Dancin' to the Hits is a nationally syndicated TV show in the United States hosted by Lorenzo Lamas during the 1986-1987 season. Professional dancers performed to a medley of Top 40 hits, and live acts performed. Some of the acts that performed were Howard Hewett, The S.O.S. Band, Samantha Fox, and Stacy Lattisaw. Dancin’ to the Hits is the Solid Gold knockoff.

The Sweet Dreams as Dancers
Aurorah Allain
Jeff Amsden
Priscilla Harris 
William Holden, Jr.
Barry Lather
Eartha Robinson
Andrea Paige Wilson (who appeared as a dancer on seasons 1-3 of Kids Incorporated (1984-1987) and cameo appeared in Kidsongs episodes "The Wonderful World of Sports" (that got renamed "Let's Play Ball" in 1990)-"A Day at the Circus" (1987))
Cheryl Yamaguchi

References

External links

Dance television shows
Dance competition television shows
1986 American television series debuts
1987 American television series endings